X1822–371, associated with the optically visible star V691 Coronae Australis (abbreviated V691 CrA), is a neutron-star X-ray binary system at a distance of approximately 2-2.5 kiloparsecs. It is known to have a high inclination of i = 82.5°± 1.5°. This source displays relatively high brightness in the optical wavelengths when compared to the X-ray, making it a prototypical Accretion Disk Coronae (ADC) source, i.e. a source with a corona extending above and below its accretion disk. The only-partial eclipses in its light curve, even at such a high inclination, support this hypothesis. Estimates of the mass of its neutron star lies between 1.14–2.32 solar masses. The optical spectrum of X1822–371 displays strong Hα, Hβ, He I, He II and Bowen Blend features. These features have been extensively studied using the technique of Doppler tomography.

References 

Corona Australis
Coronae Australis, V691
Eclipsing binaries
Neutron stars